Konyshevo is a rural locality (a village) in Razdolyevskoye Rural Settlement, Kolchuginsky District, Vladimir Oblast, Russia. The population was 14 as of 2010. There are 5 streets.

Geography 
Konyshevo is located 31 km south of Kolchugino (the district's administrative centre) by road. Vaulovo is the nearest rural locality.

References 

Rural localities in Kolchuginsky District